Gypsy Devils (Slovak Cigánski diabli) is the Slovak Orchestra, which was founded in 1991. Classical music in their submission is enriched with elements of gypsy music, folk music, jazz, ethno, flamenco and more. They use their own unique arrangements and virtuosic elements.

Remelting different styles brought them success on concert stages in 35 countries on five continents.

They performed in the concert halls of the Berlin Philharmonic, Komische Oper Berlin, Konzerthaus Berlin, Royal Opera House in London, Hans Max Saal – Munich, Smetana Hall – Prague, Concert and Kongressaal – Luzern, Concert Hall – Melbourne, Goldener Saal Musikverein – Vienna, Is Sanat Hall – Istanbul, Palace of Culture – Novosibirsk, EXPO 2008 Zaragoza Expo 2010 Shanghai.

They represented Slovakia at the Olympics: the 2010 Winter Olympic Games and Summer Olympic Games 2012. They performed at music festivals Kissinger Sommer Bad Kissingen, Beethovenfest Bonn, Pärnu David Oistrakh Festival, Liszt Festival Raiding, Euroclassic Pirmasens, Jeju World Arts Festival "Prague Spring" Sziget fesztivál Budapest, Mondial des Cultures Drummondville, Khamoro Prague and the Festival de Martigues and cooperates with many leading orchestras, conductors, singers and instrumentalists from around the world. Gipsy Kings, Paul Gulda and the Vienna String Quartet, Chamber Philharmonic Bremen, the Moravian Philharmonic, Philharmonic B.Martinu Zlín, Slovak Radio Symphony Orchestra are just a few of them.

Projects 
 Gypsy-Baroque, unconventional version of songs from the Baroque to the present, cooperation with Barocco Sempre Giovane
 Gypsy Devils & the 100-member Hungarian Gypsy Orchestra Budapest
 Gypsy Devils & Katka Knechtová, concert tour – fusion of gypsy music, classical music, pop, folk and ethno
 Gypsy Devils & Rock music, fusion of ethno and rock music, in cooperation with Slovak rock band Desmod
 Gypsy Devils & Symphony orchestras: Chamber Philharmonic Bremen, Symphony Orchestra Athens, Symphony Orchestra Nicozia
 Gypsy Devils & Paul Gulda, concerts Liszt-Roma Rhapsodie a Haydn a la Zingarese, fusion with Austrian piano virtuoso Paul Gulda
 Gypsy Devils & Jaroslav Svěcený, fusion with the Czech violin virtuoso
 Gypsy Devils & Lucie Bílá, unconventional fusion with multi-genre Czech singer
 Gypsy Devils & Totti Ovidiu, music-dance show: Gypsy Devils & dancers from Cirque du Soleil

Members 
Ernest Šarközi – arrangements and cymbalo, Silvia Šarközi – cello and solo singing, Štefan Banyák – 1st violin, Emil Hasala – 2nd violin and lyrics, Zoltán Grunza – clarinet and tarogato, Jozef Farkaš – manager and viola, Robert Fehér – doublebass

Slovak orchestras
Musical groups established in 1991